Fepulea'i Margie Apa (born 1973/1974) is a New Zealand healthcare manager and head of Te Whatu Ora, the health authority which came into operation in July 2022. Of Samoan descent she was the first Samoan to be head of a district health board.

Early life and education 
Apa was born in New Zealand in 1973 or 1974. Her parents were Samoan emigrants from Savai'i and Apia.  She grew up in Ōtara. She attended Papatoetoe High School. At the University of Auckland she gained a Bachelor of Commerce degree, followed by a Master of Public Policy from Victoria University of Wellington.

Career 
Apa has held positions as Deputy Director General in the Ministry of Health, and executive roles at Capital and Coast District Health Board, the Labour Market Policy Group, State Services Commission and the Health Funding Authority.

In 2012 she became Director, Population Health and Strategy at the Counties Manukau District Health Board (CMDHB). She was appointed chief executive of CMDHB in 2018, the first Samoan to head a District Health Board.

The New Zealand government announced in 2021 that two new health authorities, Te Whatu Ora and the Māori health authority Te Aka Whai Ora, would be created in 2022 to replace the district health boards. Apa was appointed in December 2021 as chief executive of the interim Health New Zealand.

She has also been chair of Presbyterian Support, and is on the board of World Vision.

Personal life 
Apa is married to Riki Apa and they have two daughters.

Her title Fepulea'i is a chiefly title from her father's village in Savai'i.

References

Further reading 
 Manhire, Toby. "The women in charge of rebuilding the New Zealand's health system". The Spinoff, 11 March 2022

Year of birth missing (living people)
1970s births
Living people
University of Auckland alumni
New Zealand public servants
21st-century New Zealand public servants
New Zealand healthcare chief executives
New Zealand healthcare managers
Victoria University of Wellington alumni
New Zealand people of Samoan descent
People educated at Papatoetoe High School